The Peel Sessions Album is a compilation album by English rock band Wire. It was released in 1989. It consists of nine recordings done for John Peel between 1978 and 1979.

Track listing

Personnel 

 Wire

 Graham Lewis – bass guitar, vocals
 Robert Gotobed – drums
 Bruce Gilbert – guitar
 Colin Newman – vocals, guitar

 Production

 Annette Green – photography
 Don Walker – remastering
 Vici MacDonald – sleeve design

References

External links 

 

Wire (band) compilation albums
1989 live albums
Peel Sessions recordings
Wire (band) live albums
1989 compilation albums